Mauri Arijoutsi Angervo (born July 11, 1944 in Mikkeli, Finland) is a Finnish classical violinist and conductor.

Education
Angervo studied at the Sibelius Academy in Finland, but also in Stockholm and Saint Petersburg. He studied the violin under the guidance of Onni Suhonen, chamber music with Andras Mihaly, Mieczysław Horszowski ja György Ligeti, and orchestral conducting with Arvid Jansons and Jorma Panula.

Career
Angervo played in the Finnish National Opera Orchestra from 1965 to 1975, first as a member and then as concertmaster for seven years.

Since his debut concert in 1970, Angervo has performed as a soloist and chamber musician all around Europe and New Zealand. In the 1970s, he also won prizes in national and international string quartet competitions, including 1st prize in a competition organized by YLE.

As a conductor, Angervo has worked for various Finnish city orchestras and the Finnish National Opera Orchestra. In addition, he has also conducted numerous symphony orchestras abroad, including in Germany, France, Italy, Spain, Japan and New Zealand, where he has worked as a guest conductor for the Auckland Philharmonia Orchestra.

Teaching
Angervo has taught the violin at the West Helsinki Music Institute and the Sibelius Academy, where he has also taught orchestral conducting. Additionally, Angervo has taught the violin and orchestral conducting in Finnish universities of applied sciences.

References
 Kuka kukin on (Who's Who in Finland), Otava, 1990
 Kuka kukin on (Who's Who in Finland), Otava, 2007

1944 births
Living people
People from Mikkeli
Finnish conductors (music)
Finnish classical violinists
Male classical violinists
Sibelius Academy alumni
21st-century conductors (music)
21st-century classical violinists
21st-century male musicians